Dagobert III (c.699–715) was Merovingian king of the Franks (711–715). 

He was a son of Childebert III.  He succeeded his father as the head of the three Frankish kingdoms—Neustria and Austrasia, unified since Pippin's victory at Tertry in 687, and the Kingdom of Burgundy—in 711. Real power, however, still remained with the Mayor of the Palace, Pippin of Herstal, who died in 714. Pippin's death occasioned open conflict between his heirs and the Neustrian nobles who elected the mayors of the palace. As for Dagobert himself, the Liber Historiae Francorum reports he died of illness, but otherwise says nothing about his character or actions.

While attention was focused on combatting the Frisians in the north, areas of southern Gaul began to secede during Dagobert's brief time: Savaric, the fighting bishop of Auxerre, in 714 and 715 subjugated Orléans, Nevers, Avallon, and Tonnerre on his own account, and Eudo in Toulouse and Antenor in Provence were essentially independent magnates.

The Vita Dagoberti is a late and unreliable biography of Dagobert III that partially conflates him with Dagobert II.

References

Sources

Frankish warriors
Merovingian kings
699 births
715 deaths
8th-century Frankish kings